The Canadian Journal of Netherlandic Studies (French: Revue canadienne d'études néerlandaises) is an academic journal covering Dutch studies. It is the official journal of the Canadian Association for the Advancement of Netherlandic Studies (French: Association canadienne pour l'avancement des études néerlandaises). It is published since 1979 and appears in two issues per year. All issues published since 1979 are now digitised and are available on line. https://caans-acaen.ca/category/journals/ (January 2022).

Abstracting and Indexing
Bibliographie van Nederlandse taal- en literatuurwetenschap
Linguistic Bibliography
Bibliography of the History of Art
Historical Abstracts
America: History & Life
MLA Bibliography

References

External links
 
 Canadian Association for the Advancement of Netherlandic Studies/Association canadienne pour l'avancement des études néerlandaises
 Canadian Journal page on the website of the Canadian Association of Learned Journals/Association Canadienne des revues savantes

Publications established in 1979
Biannual journals
European studies journals
Multilingual journals
Academic journals published by learned and professional societies of Canada
Open access journals
Dutch studies journals
Netherlandic studies